Colt Anderson (born October 25, 1985) is a former American football safety and coach who is the assistant special teams coach for the Cincinnati Bengals of the National Football League (NFL). He played college football at Montana and was signed by the Minnesota Vikings as an undrafted free agent in 2009. He has also played for the Philadelphia Eagles, Indianapolis Colts and Buffalo Bills.

Early years
Anderson was born on October 25, 1985 in Butte, Montana to parents Mike and Michele Anderson. He has three uncles that played college football between the University of Montana and Montana State University during the 1970s. He attended Butte High School where he lettered in football and basketball for three years, and track for two years. He played football as a running back and safety. As a junior, he was named honorable mention all-state, and as a senior in 2004, was an all-state first-team safety and honorable mention running back. The Butte High Bulldogs had an imperfect season with a record of 0-9 in Anderson's senior season. Over the course of his career, Anderson recorded 310 tackles, nine interceptions, 850 rushing yards, and 12 touchdowns. He was not recruited out of high school and chose to attend the University of Montana.

College career
Anderson attended the University of Montana, where he studied business administration. He walked onto the team, and sat out the 2004 season on redshirt status. In 2005, he saw action in five games on special teams, but suffered a broken thumb after making a tackle against Oregon. His injury curtailed his playing time, and he finished the season having recorded seven tackles. During the offseason, he worked to improve his conditioning and impressed the coaching staff enough to garner a scholarship. In 2006, Anderson started all 14 games and recorded 92 tackles. The conference named him to the All-Big Sky first-team as both a safety and on special teams. When asked if he looks for "big-hit opportunit[ies]" in 2006, he said, "I just like to fly around and make plays and every now and then you’ll come across a guy that you can hit." In 2007, he started in all 14 games. Anderson tallied 85 tackles including 58 solo and seven for loss, three forced fumbles, four interceptions, and nine pass deflections. The conference again named Anderson to the All-Big Sky first team, while The Sports Network named him an honorable mention All-American, and College Sporting News named him to its "Fabulous Fifty" team.

In 2008, Anderson served as the team captain and saw action in all 16 games. He recorded 129 tackles including 63 solo and 6.5 for loss, one quarterback sack, three interceptions returned for 80 yards, six passes broken-up, one forced fumble, and two fumble recoveries. That season, Montana advanced to the national championship game before falling to Richmond, 24–7. Anderson was selected as a Buck Buchanan Award candidate. The conference named him an All-Big Sky player for the third year and he also received the team's most valuable player honors. Virtually every FCS All-America team selector named him to its first team. The American Football Coaches Association, Associated Press, College Sporting News, and the Walter Camp Foundation named Anderson to their first teams, while the Sports Network named him an honorable mention All-American. After the season, he participated in the Texas vs. the Nation all-star game.

Professional career

Pre-draft
The CBS Sports-affiliated NFL Draft Scout assessed Anderson as the 13th-ranked of the 106 free safeties available for the 2009 NFL Draft, and considered him as a potential seventh-round selection or free agent. A Scout.com assessment commended his instincts and tackling, but described his size as "marginal for the NFL" and said he was more suited for zone coverage than man-to-man. Anderson said, "Shoot, I'm like any other person. I'll watch the first 10 picks, or maybe the first round, and then just check on it from time to time. Any NFL fan will watch that first round. Once the second round starts, I’ll be laying around, taking a nap."

Minnesota Vikings
Anderson was not selected in the 2009 draft, but he reported that ten teams pursued him shortly afterward. The Minnesota Vikings signed him as an undrafted free agent, which included a $20,000 signing bonus, a comparatively large sum. Anderson said, "I just felt Minnesota was the best opportunity for me. They thought I could have an impact for them." The Vikings won the 2009 NFC North Division title while Anderson was on the practice squad.

On September 5, 2010, Anderson was signed to the practice squad by the Vikings.

Philadelphia Eagles
Anderson was signed to a three-year contract off of the Vikings' practice squad on November 9, 2010 by the Philadelphia Eagles. Despite playing at a Pro Bowl level in 2011 as a special teams player, Anderson suffered a torn anterior cruciate ligament (ACL) in a game against the Seattle Seahawks, leading to his placement on injured reserve on December 5. He was placed on the physically unable to perform list (PUP) for the start of training camp on July 22, 2012. Anderson played eight games in 2010 and 14 games in 2013, helping the Eagles win the NFC East Division Championship in 2010 & 2013. In 4 seasons with the Eagles, Anderson played in 48 games with 6 starts.

Indianapolis Colts
Anderson signed with the Indianapolis Colts on April 21, 2014. He was one of the only NFL players ever to have the same first name as his team.

On March 10, 2015, Anderson re-signed with the Colts. On October 18, 2015 against the New England Patriots, Indianapolis coach Chuck Pagano called for a fake punt on 4th and 3 late in the third quarter. The play left Griff Whalen snapping the ball to Anderson with no Colts teammates blocking and two Patriots players standing over the ball. Anderson was tackled for a loss, and the Patriots took over on downs and scored a touchdown en route to a 34-27 victory. Anderson helped the Indianapolis Colts win the 2014 AFC South Division Championship, reaching the Conference Championship against the New England Patriots in the 2015 AFC Championship Game.

Buffalo Bills
Anderson signed with the Buffalo Bills on April 12, 2016. On October 10, 2016, he was placed on injured reserve with a hand injury.

On January 27, 2017, Anderson was re-signed by the Bills. He was released on September 4, 2017, but was re-signed the next day. He was placed on injured reserve on October 3, 2017. He was activated off injured reserve to the active roster on December 28, 2017. Anderson helped the Bills reach the Wild-Card playoffs on January 7, 2018.

NFL statistics

Coaching career
Anderson was hired by the Cincinnati Bengals as the team's assistant special teams coach on February 10, 2020.

References

External links
Indianapolis Colts bio
Philadelphia Eagles bio

1985 births
Living people
Sportspeople from Butte, Montana
Players of American football from Montana
American football safeties
Montana Grizzlies football players
Minnesota Vikings players
Philadelphia Eagles players
Indianapolis Colts players
Buffalo Bills players
Cincinnati Bengals coaches
Ed Block Courage Award recipients